Abbi Grant (born 11 December 1995) is a Scottish footballer who plays as a forward for Glasgow City and for the Scotland national team.

Club career
On 13 March 2012, Grant left Rangers to join Forfar Farmington. On 13 February 2014, after two years with Forfar, Grant signed with Glasgow City. She moved to Hibernian in 2015. She also played for Celtic before being re-signed by Glasgow City in 2016.

Grant signed for Belgian club Anderlecht in January 2019 and went on to win the Belgian Super League. 

Grant then signed for Birmingham City in the FA Women's Super League on a two year deal in July 2019. Birmingham City head coach Marta Tejedor welcomed Grant as a "valuable acquisition". Tejedor added: "Abbi is a young and talented player who will give speed and versatility to our attack in different positions of the field."

On 21st July 2021, Grant signed for Leicester City ahead of their first WSL season. She returned to Glasgow City for a third time in January 2022, on loan until the end of the season.

International career
In February 2018, Grant received her first senior call-up by the Scotland national team. On 6 March 2018, she made her senior debut in a 2–0 victory over New Zealand. Grant made her first senior level competitive appearance during Euro 2021 qualifying, in an 8–0 victory over Cyprus at Easter Road on 30 September 2019. She scored her first international goal during the 2020 Pinatar Cup, in a 1–0 victory against Iceland.

International goals

Honours

Club
Glasgow City
 Scottish Women's Premier League: 2014, 2015, 2017 2018
 Scottish Women's Premier League Cup: 2015
 Scottish Women's Cup: 2014, 2015     

RSC Anderlecht
Belgian Super League: 2018/19

Individual
 SWPL Player of the Month: November 2017, August 2018

References

External links
 Abbi Grant at the Scottish Football Association (SFA)
 Abbi Grant at Glasgow City
 Abbi Grant at Soccerway

1995 births
Living people
Scottish women's footballers
Hibernian W.F.C. players
Women's association football forwards
Scotland women's international footballers
Glasgow City F.C. players
Celtic F.C. Women players
RSC Anderlecht (women) players
Expatriate women's footballers in Belgium
Scottish expatriate sportspeople in Belgium
Scottish expatriate women's footballers
Rangers W.F.C. players
Super League Vrouwenvoetbal players
Footballers from Dundee
Forfar Farmington F.C. players
Women's Super League players
Birmingham City W.F.C. players
Leicester City W.F.C. players
Scottish Women's Premier League players